The 13th Airborne Division Artillery is an inactive field artillery unit of the United States Army, active from 1943-1946. The unit served with the 13th Airborne Division in World War II and deployed to France, but was not committed to combat, although the 460th Parachute Field Artillery Battalion saw action with the 517th Parachute Regimental Combat Team before its assignment to the division.

History

Lineage & honors

Lineage
Constituted 26 December 1942 in the Army of the United States as Headquarters and Headquarters Battery, 13th Airborne Division Artillery
Activated 13 August 1943 at Fort Bragg, North Carolina
Inactivated 25 February 1946 at Fort Bragg, North Carolina

Campaign participation credit

Decorations

See also
13th Airborne Division

References

External links
 Facebook Page: 13th Airborne Division WW2

013
Airborne artillery units and formations
Military units and formations established in 1943
Military units and formations disestablished in 1946